JamGrass: Progressive Bluegrass Jams on a Band Called Phish is a country and progressive bluegrass tribute album to the rock band Phish performed by a number of veteran Nashville session musicians, and released on March 23, 2004. The album's lead vocalist is Travis Stinson, who has performed on a number of occasions with  The String Cheese Incident. The album mainly features material from the latter part of Phish's career.

Track listing
Birds Of A Feather  - 4:41  
Bouncing Around The Room - 4:08 
Sample In A Jar - 4:00
Chalk Dust Torture - 4:38 
Farmhouse - 3:37
Fast Enough For You - 3:45   
Down With Disease - 4:04 
Heavy Things - 3:25  
46 Days - 4:37   
Free - 3:17   
Gotta Jibboo - 4:59 
Back On The Train - 3:40

Personnel
Scott Simontacchi: vocals, mandolin
 
Travis Stinson: vocals
 
Johnny Hiland: guitar
 
Mark Fain: bass
 
Bryan Landers: banjo
 
Andy Leftwich: fiddle
 
Bob Mater: drums
 
Wright Pinson: percussion

2004 albums
Phish tribute albums